Jupiter LVI, provisionally known as , is a natural satellite of Jupiter. It was discovered by Scott Sheppard in 2011. Images of the newly discovered moon were captured using the Magellan-Baade telescope at the Las Campanas Observatory in Chile. It is an irregular moon with a retrograde orbit. The discovery of Jupiter LVI brought the Jovian satellite count to 67. It is one of the outer retrograde swarm of objects orbiting Jupiter and belongs to the Pasiphae group.

The moon was lost following its discovery in 2011. It was recovered in 2017 and given its permanent designation that year.

References

External links
2 New Satellites of Jupiter Discovered, Carnegie Institution Department of Terriestrial Magnetism, 23 February 2012

Moons of Jupiter
Irregular satellites
Discoveries by Scott S. Sheppard
20110927
Pasiphae group
Moons with a retrograde orbit